The men's three-cushion billiards singles tournament at the 1998 Asian Games in Thailand took place from 7 December to 9 December at Land Sports Complex.

Akio Shimada of Japan won the gold after beating his compatriot Ryuji Umeda in the final.

Schedule
All times are Indochina Time (UTC+07:00)

Results

References 
Results

External links 
OCA official website

Cue sports at the 1998 Asian Games